Etmopterus compagnoi is a shark of the family Etmopteridae found in the southeast Atlantic off southwestern Cape Province and northern Natal in South Africa at a depth of 479 to 923 metres. It is sometimes considered conspecific with the brown lanternshark.

References

Etmopterus
Fish described in 1990